Deogarh may refer to:
Location
 Debagarh, Odisha, also known as Deogarh, a city in Debagarh District, India
 Deoghar,  Jharkhand, also known as Deogharh, a city in India, home to the Vaidyanath temple
 Deogarh, Madhya Pradesh, also known as Devgarh, a historic fortress-city in Chhindwara District of India's Madhya Pradesh state
 Devgarh, Maharashtra, also known as Deogarh or Devgad, a coastal city in Sindhudurg District of India's Maharashtra state
 Deogarh, Rajasthan, also known as Devgarh, a city and fortress in Rajsamand District of India's Rajasthan state
 Deogarh, Uttar Pradesh, a temple city in Lalitpur District of India's Uttar Pradesh state
 Deogarh (Lok Sabha constituency), abolished in 2008

Monument
 Deogarh temple, a historically important Indian temple dated to about 500 CE

See also
 Devgarh (disambiguation)